John Raymond Jr. (September 9, 1665 – April 12, 1737) was a member of the Connecticut House of Representatives from Norwalk, Connecticut Colony, in the October 1716 session.

He was the son of John Raymond and Mary Betts.

On December 16, 1713, Raymond was appointed by a majority vote of a town meeting to a committee including Joseph Platt and James Stewart to establish a road to Ridgefield.

References 

1665 births
1737 deaths
American surveyors
Burials in East Norwalk Historical Cemetery
Members of the Connecticut House of Representatives
Politicians from Norwalk, Connecticut